Sacred Heart Higher Secondary School, also known as S.H., Changanacherry 9°26'44.4588N 76°33'3.888E is a pioneer among the recognized English Medium Schools in the unaided sector in Kerala, India. The school was founded by Fr. K.J. Antony Kaithara, a member of the Sacred Heart Institution, under the patronage of Mar Mathew Kavukattu, the late Archbishop of Changanacherry in 1964. The ICSE wing started in 2002, and it was raised to a junior college in 2008. The manager of the school is Rev. Fr Joseph Nedumparampil, Mr.P.A. Kuriachan is the Principal and Mr. James Antony serves as the administrative officer. Fr. O.J. Varghese  was the principal for many decades. The motto of the school is Learn, Labour, Serve. It was mentioned in the Malayalam movie, Varnapakittu. The civil servant, Raju Narayana Swamy studied at S.H.

Sacred Heart Higher Secondary
The school was founded by Fr. K.J. Antony Kaithara, a member of the sacred Heart institution, under the patronage of Mar Mathew kavukattu, the late Archbishop of Changanacherry in the year 1964.

Sacred Heart ICSE School
This school started in 2002. In 2008 it was upgraded as a junior College. Archbishop Mar Joseph Powathil is the founder patron of the ICSE school. Sacred Heart Higher Secondary, ICSE and ISC Junior college is the realisation and embodiments of a long cherished dream of the Archdiocese of Changnacherry. It is named after the Sacred Heart of Jesus, the symbol of Jesus Christ.

Sacred Heart Apostolic School
Attached to the Higher Secondary School, there is an Apostolic school to foster vocations for priestly and religious life. Catholic boys aspiring for priesthood are welcome to the apostolic boarding house in std VII. Deserving pupils will be given fee concession

References

Christian schools in Kerala
High schools and secondary schools in Kerala
Schools in Kottayam district